Artem Oleksandrovych Dovbyk (born 21 June 1997) is a Ukrainian professional footballer who plays as a forward for Ukrainian Premier League club Dnipro-1 and the Ukraine national team.

Club career
Born in Cherkasy, Ukraine, Dovbyk is a product of the FC Cherkaskyi Dnipro academy after graduating from the Olympic Reserve Specialized Sports School Slavutych in Cherkasy. His professional debut Dovbyk made with his home team in 2014. He won the 2014–15 Ukrainian Second League, scoring 7 goals.

In summer of 2015 he signed a contract with FC Dnipro, but in April 2016 he was then sent on a three-month loan to Moldovan club FC Zaria Bălți, where he won the Moldovan Cup. He would go on to score a joint team high 6 goals as he won the 2016–17 Ukrainian Premier League Best Young Player award. This prompted Ukraine national team coach Andriy Shevchenko to call him up for 2018 FIFA World Cup qualifiers.

When Dnipro were relegated due to incurring debt, Dovbyk stayed with the club. He would go on to score 12 goals in 13 games in the Ukrainian Second League, gaining interest from foreign clubs, and in 2018 he joined Danish club FC Midtjylland on a free transfer. In 2018 with FC Midtjylland Dovbyk became a national champion and in 2019 becoming a national cup holder. On 2 September 2019, he was loaned out to SønderjyskE for the 2019–20 season. With SønderjyskE, Dovbyk for the second time became a Danish cup holder.

After a lack of regular playing time and dry run on scoresheet, in 2020 Dovbyk returned to Ukraine signing with the recently established SC Dnipro-1 that was just promoted to the Ukrainian premiers in previous season. While his league performance was somewhat under par from what expected, Dovbyk made a nice score run in the Ukrainian Cup netting 4 goals in three games, becoming one of the three top scorers in the tournament.

International career
Dovbyk was called up in the training camp of the Ukraine U19 national team, but did not played any game for this representation.

At the age of 19, Dovbyk received his first call-up to the full national team when he was named in the 31-player senior squad for the 2018 FIFA World Cup qualification match against Iceland on 5 September 2016.

He took part in 2017 UEFA European Under-21 Championship qualification as a 19-year-old and participated on the 2019 UEFA European Under-21 Championship qualification.

He made his debut for Ukraine on 31 March 2021 in a World Cup qualifier against Kazakhstan.

On 29 June 2021, Dovbyk made his debut in UEFA Euro 2020, as a substitute for Andriy Yarmolenko in the extra time of the round of 16 against Sweden. He scored the winning goal in the stoppage time of the overtime to secure a 2–1 victory for Ukraine and qualification to the quarter-finals.

Career statistics

Club

International

As of match played 24 September 2022. Scores and results list Ukraine's goal tally first, score column indicates score after each Dovbyk goal.

Honours
Cherkaskyi Dnipro
Ukrainian Second League: 2014–2015

Zaria
Moldovan Cup: 2016

Midtjylland
Danish Superliga: 2017–18
Danish Cup:  2018–19

SønderjyskE
Danish Cup: 2019–20

Individual
Ukrainian Premier League Best Young Player: 2016–17
Ukrainian Cup Top scorer (shared): 2020–21

References

External links
 
 

1997 births
Living people
Sportspeople from Cherkasy
Association football forwards
Ukrainian footballers
Ukraine youth international footballers
Ukraine under-21 international footballers
Ukraine international footballers
FC Cherkashchyna players
FC Dnipro players
CSF Bălți players
FC Midtjylland players
SønderjyskE Fodbold players
SC Dnipro-1 players
Moldovan Super Liga players
Ukrainian Premier League players
Ukrainian Second League players
Danish Superliga players
UEFA Euro 2020 players
Ukrainian expatriate footballers
Ukrainian expatriate sportspeople in Moldova
Expatriate footballers in Moldova
Ukrainian expatriate sportspeople in Denmark
Expatriate men's footballers in Denmark
Dnipro Academy people